Cotoneaster ambiguus, the dubious cotoneaster, is a species of flowering plant in the family Rosaceae, native to central China and Inner Mongolia, and introduced to Belgium and Norway. A shrub of dense forests, it is morphologically intermediate between Cotoneaster moupinensis and C. acutifolius. It is occasionally available from commercial suppliers.

References

ambiguus
Endemic flora of China
Flora of Inner Mongolia
Flora of North-Central China
Flora of South-Central China
Plants described in 1912